Italy competed at the 2011 World Championships in Athletics from August 27 to September 4 in Daegu, South Korea.

Medalists

Finalists
Italy national athletics team ranked 17th (with 7 finalists) in the IAAF placing table. Rank obtained by assigning eight points in the first place and so on to the eight finalists.

Advanced after Russian doping scandal, Elisa Rigaudo (from 4th to 2nd), Alex Schwazer (from 9th to 7th) and Silvia Salis (from 9th to 8th).

Team selection
The Italian Federation has announced a team of 33 athletes for the forthcoming event. The captain of this team is Nicola Vizzoni, at his eight consecutive participations to Worlds Championships. The team will be led by Olympic 50 km Race walk champion Alex Schwazer and European Indoor champions Antonietta Di Martino (High Jump) and Simona La Mantia (Triple Jump).

The following athletes appeared on the preliminary Entry List, but not on the Official Start List of the specific event, resulting in a total number of 30 competitors:

Results
For the Italian national team participated at the events 30 athletes, 15 men and 15 women.

Men (15)

Women (15)

Heptathlon

References

External links
Official local organising committee website
Official IAAF competition website

Nations at the 2011 World Championships in Athletics
World Championships in Athletics
2011